

M
 MAA  - Magma Arizona Railroad
 MAAX - Maxx Leasing Company
 MACX - Mac Acquisitions
 MADU - Magnum Speditionsgelleshaft
 MAEU - Maersk Lines
 MAGX - Magnimet, Monroe Scrap Division
 MAIX - Macon Iron and Paper Stock
 MAJU - Malaysian International Shipping Corporation
 MALX - Mid-America Locomotive and Car Repair
 MALZ - American President Lines
 MANX - Manchester Gas Company; Williams Energy Ventures
 MAPX - MAPCO Products Company; Williams Energy Ventures
 MARX - MidAmerican Energy Corporation
 MARZ - MARTRAC
 MASX - GE Rail Services
 MATU - Matson Navigation Company
 MATX - Merchants Investment Company
 MATZ - Matson Navigation Company
 MAW  - Maumee and Western Railroad
 MAXU - Maxu Containers
 MAXX - MidAmerican Energy Company
 MAYW - Maywood and Sugar Creek
 MB   - Meridian & Bigbee Railroad
 MBBX - Tank Car Services
 MBCX - MBCX Leasing
 MBFX - MBF Industries
 MBIX - Morse Brothers
 MBKX - MRC Rail Services
 MBLX - Exxon-Mobil Corporation
 MBPX - MacMillan-Bloedell
 MBRR - Meridian & Bigbee Railroad
 MBSX - Mid-South Bulk Services
 MBT  - Marianna and Blountstown Railroad
 MBTX - Massachusetts Bay Transportation Authority
 MC   - Michigan Central Railroad; New York Central Railroad; Penn Central; Maine Coast Railroad (1991-2000); Massachusetts Coastal Railroad (2007-)
 MCCX - Mount Vernon Coal Transfer Company; Mount Vernon Transfer Terminal
 MCDX - Redland Worth Corporation; Sunbelt Cement
 MCER - Massachusetts Central Railroad
 MCEU - Massachusetts Central Railroad
 MCEZ - Massachusetts Central Railroad
 MCHX - Trinity Rail Management
 MCIX - Mobley Company (Applied Chemicals Division)
 MCLR - McLaughlin Line Railroad
 MCLX - Morrison Car Leasing
 MCMU - Management Control and Maintenance
 MCMX - MC Rail Services
 MCPX - Monsanto Company; Solutia
 MCR  - McCloud River Railroad; McCloud Railway
 MCRR - Monongahela Connecting Railroad
 MCRX - Marcus Rail Transport
 MCRY - Mid Continent Railway
 MCSA - Moscow, Camden and San Augustine Railroad
 MCSU - China Ocean Shipping Company
 MCTA - Minnesota Central Railroad
 MCTX - Modern Continental Construction Company
 MCVX - Massachusetts Call Volunteer Firefighters' Association
 MD   - Municipal Docks
 MDAX - Merchants Despatch Transportation Corporation
 MDCX - Mexicana De Cobre, SA de CV
 MDDE - Maryland and Delaware Railroad
 MDDX - Old Line Holding Company
 MDIX - Modern Dispersions
 MDKX - Gardau MRM Steel (Mandak Metal Processors Division)
 MDLR - Midland Terminal Company
 MDP  - Mexican Pacific Railroad (Ferrocarril Mexicano del Pacifico)
 MDR  - Kansas City Southern Railway
 MDS  - Meridian Southern Railway
 MDSB - Burlington Northern Railroad
 MDSZ - Medspan Shipping Service
 MDT  - Merchants Despatch Transportation Corporation
 MDTX - Merchants Despatch Refrigerator Line
 MDW  - Minnesota, Dakota & Western Railway
 MDWU - Minnesota, Dakota & Western Railway
 MDWZ - Minnesota, Dakota & Western Railway
 ME   - Morristown & Erie Railway
 MEC  - Maine Central Railroad; Pan Am Railways
 MECX - Trinity Rail Management
 MEFX - MexFresh
 MEFZ - MexFresh
 MELX - Sunbelt Cement
 MEPX - McGraw-Edison Company
 MERR - Maine Eastern Railroad
 MERX - Merco
 MESX - Mears/CPG
 MET  - Modesto and Empire Traction Company
 METW - Municipality of East Troy Wisconsin
 METX - Northeast Illinois Regional Commuter Railroad Corporation (Metra)
 MF   - Middle Fork Railroad
 MFCX - Farmers Coop Grain and Supply Company; First Union Rail
 MFFX - M4 Holdings
 MG   - Mobile and Gulf Railroad
 MGA  - Monongahela Railway; Norfolk Southern
 MGGU - Marcevaggi
 MGMX - J and J Partnership
 MGRI - MG Rail
 MGRS - Ferrocarriles Nacionales de Mexico
 MGSX - Martin Gas Sales; CF Martin Sulphur
 MH   - Mount Hood Railroad
 MHAX - United States Department of the Interior (Bureau of Mines Helium Field Operations)
 MHCO - Marquette and Huron Mountain Railroad
 MHFX - MHF Logistical Solutions
 MHLX - General American Transportation Corporation
 MHM  - Norfolk Southern
 MHQU - Military Sealift Command (Washington, DC)
 MHQZ - Military Sealift Command
 MHRX - Mile-High Railcar Services
 MHWA - Mohawk, Adirondack and Northern Railroad
 MI   - Missouri-Illinois Railroad; Missouri Pacific Railroad; Union Pacific
 MICO - Midland Continental Railroad
 MID  - Midway Railroad 
 MIDH - Middletown and Hummelstown Railroad
 MIDL - Midland Railway
 MIDX - MRC Rail Services
 MIEU - MI Engineering
 MIGN - Michigan Northern Railway
 MILW - Milwaukee Road; Soo Line Railroad; Canadian Pacific Railway
 MILX - Milchem; GE Rail Services Corporation
 MILZ - Soo Line Railroad, Canadian Pacific Railway
 MIMX - Minera Mexico International
 MINE - Minneapolis Eastern Railway
 MINU - China Ocean Shipping Company
 MIPX - Millennium Petrochemicals
 MIR  - Minneapolis Industrial Railway
 MIRX - Regional Recycling
 MIS  - Mississippi Central Railroad
 MISS - Mississippian Railway
 MISU - Malaysian International Shipping Corporation
 MISX - Milwaukee Solvents and Chemicals Corporation
 MJ   - Manufacturers' Junction Railway
 MJRX - M Ryan Railway Service Contractors
 MJVU - Merco
 MKC  - McKeesport Connecting Railroad
 MKCX - Morrison-Knudsen
 MKFX - Century Rail Enterprises
 MKIX - M-K Railroad Equipment Leasing Company; Morrison-Knudsen
 MKNR - Mackenzie Northern Railway
 MKT  - Missouri-Kansas-Texas Railroad; Union Pacific
 MKTT - Missouri-Kansas-Texas Railroad; Union Pacific
 MKTZ - Union Pacific
 MLCU - NYK Line
 MLCX - American Refrigerator Transit Company
 MLD  - Midland Railway Co. of Manitoba
 MLEX - Miles
 MLHX - American Refrigerator Transit Company
 MLIX - Melbo Land and Investment Company
 MLLX - Montell USA, Basell USA
 MLMX - Morrison Grain Company; Metal Management
 MLSX - Monsanto Company
 MLUX - Solutia
 MMA  - Montreal, Maine & Atlantic Railway
 MMAC - Montreal, Maine & Atlantic Railway
 MMAX - Martin Marietta Aluminum; Martin Marietta Corporation
 MMBX - Martin Marietta Corporation; Master Builders
 MMCU - CIE Des Messageries Maritimes
 MMCX - M&M Chemical Products; TransMatrix
 MMID - Maryland Midland Railway
 MMMU - Fesco Pacific Lines
 MMMX - Minnesota Mining and Manufacturing (3M)
 MMRR - Mid-Michigan Railroad
 MMRX - Double M Ranch Enterprises
 MMSX - Blue Circle
 MMXZ - Murphy Motor Express
 MNA  - Missouri & Northern Arkansas Railroad
 MNAX - C and S Directional Boring
 MNBR - Meridian & Bigbee Railroad
 MNC  - Missouri North Central Railroad
 MNCW - Metro-North Commuter Railroad
 MNCX - Minnesota Corn Processors
 MNJ  - Middletown and New Jersey Railway
 MNLU - Malaysian International Shipping Corporation
 MNLX - Exxon-Mobil Corporation
 MNN  - Minnesota Northern Railroad
 MNNR - Minnesota Commercial Railway
 MNPX - Morton Norwich Products; Morton International
 MNRX - Northstar Line
 MNS  - Minneapolis, Northfield and Southern Railway; Soo Line Railroad; Canadian Pacific Railway
 MNTX - Minnesota Transportation Museum
 MNWX - Minnesota Department of Public Service (Weights and Measures Division)
 MOBX - Mobil Oil Corporation; Exxon-Mobil Corporation
 MOC  - Missouri Central Railroad
 MOCX - Missouri Portland Cement Company
 MOD  - Missouri Pacific Railroad
 MOEX - Morgan Engineering
 MOFX - Maxton Oil and Fertilizer Company
 MOGX - C.W. Brooks
 MOHX - Monsanto Company; Solutia
 MOLU - Mitsui OSK Lines
 MOLX - International Molasses Corporation
 MON  - Monon Railroad; Seaboard System Railroad; CSX Transportation
 MONX - Monsanto Company; Solutia
 MOPZ - Flexi-Van Leasing
 MORZ - Mitsui OSK Lines
 MOSX - Mosinee Paper Corporation
 MOSZ - Mitsui OSK Lines
 MOT  - Marine Oil Transportation
 MOTC - Montreal Tramways
 MOTU - Monsanto
 MOTX - National Museum of Transportation
 MOTZ - Mitsui OSK Lines
 MOWX - Fortaleza Construction Company
 MOXV - Moxahala Valley Railway
 MP   - Missouri Pacific Railroad; Union Pacific
 MPA  - Maryland and Pennsylvania Railroad; York Railway
 MPCX - Moyer Packing Company; Michels Pipeline Construction
 MPEX - MotivePower
 MPIT - Union Pacific
 MPIX - Myer's Propane Gas Service; MotivePower
 MPLI - Minnesota Prairie Line
 MPLX - GE Rail Services
 MPLZ - Union Pacific
 MPRX - Motive Power & Equipment Solutions
 MPSX - Missouri Public Service
 MPTX - Procor
 MPU  - Missouri Pacific Railroad, Union Pacific
 MPWX - Muscatine Power and Water
 MPZ  - Union Pacific
 MQCX - Monarch Cement Company
 MQGX - Morrison-Quirk Grain Corporation
 MQPX - Millennium Inorganic Chemicals
 MQT  - Marquette Rail
 MR   - McCloud River Railroad; McLeod Railway
 MRAX - Mineral Range
 MRCX - Evans Railcar Leasing Company; GE Rail Services Corporation
 MRDX - MidAmerican Energy Company
 MREX - Marshall Railway Equipment Corporation; Monad Railway Equipment Company
 MRHS - Midland Railway
 MRI  - Mohall Railroad
 MRIX  - Motive Rail Industries
 MRL  - Montana Rail Link
 MRMX - Midwest Railcar Corporation (previously named MRM Leasing and Management)
 MRMZ - Monticello Railway Museum
 MRR  - Carolina Southern Railroad
 MRRX - GE Rail Services; Murphy Road Recycling
 MRS  - Manufacturers Railway Company; Anheuser-Busch
 MRSX - Mile-High Railcar Services
 MS   - Michigan Shore Railroad
 MSAZ - National Motor Freight Traffic Association
 MSC  - Illinois Central Gulf Railroad (Mississippi Central, Hattiesburg to Natchez)
 MSCI - Mississippi Central Railroad (Oxford to Grand Jct)
 MEDU - Mediterranean Shipping Company
 MSMU - Mediterranean Shipping Company
 MSCU - Mediterranean Shipping Company
 MSDU - Mediterranean Shipping Company
 MSCZ - Mediterranean Shipping Company
 MSDR - Mississippi Delta Railroad, Rock Island Rail
 MSE  - Mississippi Export Railroad
 MSKU - Maersk Line, Maersk Sealand
 MSKU - Safmarine Container Lines
 MSEX - Princess Tours
 MSIX - Morton International
 MSL  - Montgomery Short Line
 MSLC - Minnesota Short Lines Company
 MSMX - Mid South Milling Company
 MSN  - Meeker Southern Railroad
 MSO  - Michigan Southern Railroad
 MSPX - P4 Productions
 MSQU - Military Sealift Command (Bayonne, New Jersey)
 MSR  - Mississippi Southern Railroad (Watco)
 MSRC - Kansas City Southern Railway (former MidSouth Railcorp)
 MSRW - Mississippian Railway
 MSTL - Minneapolis and St. Louis Railway; Chicago & North Western Railway; Union Pacific
 MSTR - Massena Terminal Railroad
 MSUU - USPCI
 MSV  - Mississippi and Skuna Valley Railroad
 MSWY - Minnesota Southern Railway
 MT   - Mississippi and Tennessee RailNet
 MTAX - MTAX Corporation
 MTC  - Mystic Terminal Company
 MTCO - Macon Terminal Company
 MTCX - Mallard Transportation Company
 MTCZ - Mayflower Transit and Storage
 MTDX - Midwest Transportation and Development Company
 MTFR - Minnesota Transfer Railway
 MTIU - Welfit Oddy
 MTIZ - American Marine Industries
 MTLU - Montgomery Tank Lines
 MTLX - Metal Link International
 MTMU - March
 MTMX - Modern Track Machinery
 MTNX - Rocky Mountain Transportation Services
 MTPX - Montana Power Company
 MTR  - Montour Railroad; Youngstown and Southeastern Railroad
 MTRX - TransMatrix
 MTSU - Marine Transport Service
 MTTX - Trailer Train Company; TTX Company
 MTW  - Marinette, Tomahawk and Western Railroad
 MTZ  - Mitsui OSK Lines
 MULX - MUL Railcars Leasing LLC
 MUSC - Memphis Union Station Company
 MV   - Midland Valley Railroad
 MVCX - Chaparral Energy
 MVP  - Missouri and Valley Park Railroad
 MVRY - Mahoning Valley Railway
 MVT  - Mount Vernon Terminal
 MWAX - Martin Marietta Materials
 MWBX - Midwest By-Products Company
 MWCL - Midwest Coal Handling
 MWCX - Midwest Railcar Corporation
 MWHX - Markwest Hydrocarbon Partners
 MWLX - Midwest Locomotive Leasing and Sales
 MWLZ - Madrigal-Wan Hai Lines Corporation
 MWMX - Midwest Mud Company; Golden Leasing
 MWPX - Murco Wall Products
 MWR  - Muncie and Western Railroad
 MWRC - Mount Washington Railway
 MWRL - Molalla Western Railway; Hillvista Investment Company
 MWRR - Montana Western Railway
 MWRX - Midwest Rail
 MWSX - Midwest Solvents Company; GE Rail Services
 MWTT - Michigan-Wisconsin Transportation Company
 MXLU - Mexican Line
 MZIZ - Marko B Zanovich

M